Huppy is a commune in the Somme department in Hauts-de-France in northern France.

Geography

Àt 100 metres altitude on the limestone plateau of the old region of the Vimeu. The land is fertile and well-watered. Electricity generating turbines now stand in the fields where once wind-mills stood.

Places of interest
 The Château
In 1940, during World War II, the château of Huppy became the headquarters of General Charles de Gaulle, commanding officer (as a colonel) of the 4th Division de Cuirassé, during the battle of Abbeville (28 – 31 May). A bust in memorial to the General is placed in the village square.A commemorative monument about the battle has been built at the western entrance to the village.

Population

See also
Communes of the Somme department

References

External links

 Official Huppy website 
 The communes of Hallencourt 

Communes of Somme (department)